Ernesto Lecuona y Casado (August 7, 1896 – November 29, 1963) was a Cuban composer and pianist, many of whose works have become standards of the Latin, jazz and classical repertoires. His over 600 compositions include songs and zarzuelas as well as pieces for piano and symphonic orchestra.

In the 1930s, he helped establish a popular band, the Lecuona Cuban Boys, which showcased some of his most successful pieces and was later taken over by Armando Oréfiche. In the 1950s, Lecuona recorded several LPs, including solo piano albums for RCA Victor. He moved to the United States after the Cuban Revolution and died in Spain in 1963.

Early years 
Lecuona was born in Guanabacoa, Havana, Cuba, Kingdom of Spain, to a Cuban mother and a Canarian father. There are inconsistencies surrounding his birthdate, with some sources indicating the year 1895, and others still giving the day as August 6. He started studying piano at the age of five, under the tuition of his sister Ernestina Lecuona, a famed composer in her own right. As a child prodigy, he composed his first song at the age of 11. He later studied at the Peyrellade Conservatoire under Antonio Saavedra and Joaquín Nin. Lecuona graduated from the National Conservatory of Havana with a Gold Medal for interpretation when he was 15 years old. He performed outside of Cuba at the Aeolian Hall (New York) in 1916.

In 1918, he collaborated with Luis Casas Romero, Moisés Simons, Jaime Prats, Nilo Menéndez and Vicente Lanz in setting up a successful player piano music roll factory in Cuba producing Cuban music and also copies from masters made by QRS in the US. The brand label was "Rollo Autógrafo".

Rise to fame 

He first traveled to Spain in 1924 on a concert tour with violinist Marta de la Torre; his successful piano recitals in 1927 and 1928 at the Salle Pleyel in Paris coincided with a rise in interest in Cuban music. His popularity brought him to concert halls in Buenos Aires, Rio de Janeiro, and Lima in South America, as well as Paris, Nice, Barcelona, Madrid, and London in Europe, followed by more engagements in New York.

María la O, Lecuona's zarzuela, premiered in Havana on March 1, 1930. He was a prolific composer of songs and music for stage and film. He scored some of the film music for The Cuban Love Song, Always in My Heart, and One More Tomorrow.  The entire musical score of the film Carnival in Costa Rica was penned by Lecuona. His works consisted of zarzuela, Afro-Cuban and Cuban rhythms, suites and many songs which are still famous. They include "Siboney" ("Canto Siboney"), "Malagueña" and "The Breeze And I" ("Andalucía"). In 1942, his hit, "Always in my Heart" ("Siempre en mi Corazón") was nominated for an Academy Award for Best Song; however, it lost to "White Christmas". Lecuona was a master of the symphonic form and conducted the Ernesto Lecuona Symphonic Orchestra, employing soloists including Cuban pianist and composer Carmelina Delfín. The Orchestra performed in the Cuban Liberation Day Concert at Carnegie Hall on October 10, 1943. The concert included the world premiere of Lecuona's Black Rhapsody. Lecuona gave help and the use of his name to the popular touring group, the Lecuona Cuban Boys, though he did not play as a member of the band. He did sometimes play piano solos as the first item on the bill.

Final years and legacy 

In 1960, thoroughly unhappy with Castro's new régime, Lecuona moved to Tampa, Florida and lived on West Orient Street in West Tampa with his relative, singer Esperanza Chediak. Lecuona lived his final years in the US, but while traveling in the Canary Islands three years later, he died of a heart attack in the town of Santa Cruz de Tenerife on November 29, 1963, where he was trying to recuperate from a lung ailment. He was interred at Gate of Heaven Cemetery in Hawthorne, New York, but his will instructs that his remains be repatriated once the current régime runs its course. A great deal of Lecuona's music was first introduced to mass American audiences by Desi Arnaz, a fellow Cuban and Lucille Ball's spouse.

Lecuona's talent for composition has influenced the Latin American world in a way quite similar to George Gershwin in the United States, in his case raising Cuban music to classical status.

Ernesto and Ernestina's cousin Margarita Lecuona was another accomplished musician and composer. She was the author of the song "Babalú", made popular in the Latin American world by Miguelito Valdés, and in the United States by Desi Arnaz.

Selected compositions

For piano
 Ante El Escorial
 Aragón
 Aragonesa
 San Francisco El Grande
 Siboney
 Suite Andalucía
 Córdoba
 Andalucía
 Alhambra
 Gitanerías
 Guadalquivir
 Malagueña
 Valencia Mora
 Zambra Gitana

Waltz
 Apasionado
 Crisantemo
 La bemol
 Maravilloso
 Poético
 Romántico
 Si menor (Rococó)
 Vals Azul

Others
 Afro-Cuban suite
 Ahí viene el chino
 Al fin te vi
 Amorosa
 Andar
 Aquí está
 Arabesque
 Bell Flower
 Benilde
 Burlesca
 Canto del guajiro
 Cajita de música
 Como arrullo de palmas
 Como baila el muñeco
 Dame tu amor
 Danza de los Ñáñigos
 Danza Lucumí
 Diario de un niño
 Ella y yo
 ¡Échate pa'llá María!
 El batey
 El miriñaque
 El sombrero de yarey
 El tanguito de Mamá (también llamada A la Antigua)
 En tres por cuatro
 Eres tú el amor
 Futurista
 Gonzalo, ¡no bailes más!
 Impromptu
 La 32
 La primera en la frente
 La Comparsa
 La conga de medianoche
 La habanera
 La danza interrumpida
 La mulata
 La negra Lucumí
 La Cardenense
 Los Minstrels
 Lola Cruz
 Lola está de fiesta
 Lloraba en sueños
 Mazurka en glissando
 Melancolía
 Mientras yo comía maullaba el gato
 Mis tristezas
 María la O
 Muneca de Cristal
 Muñequita
 Negra Mercé
 Negrita
 ¡No hables más!
 No me olvides
 No puedo contigo
 Noche Azul
 Orquídeas
 Pensaba en ti
 Polichinela
 ¿Por qué te vas?
 Preludio en la noche
 ¡Que risa me da!  Mi abuela bailaba así
 Rapsodia Negra
 Rosa, la china
 Tú serás
 Tres miniaturas
 ¡Y la negra bailaba!
 ¡Y sigue la lloviznita!
 Yo soy así
 Yumurí
 Zapateo y guajira
 Zenaida

See also

 List of Cubans
Rafael A. Lecuona
Marcos Madrigal

References

External links
Songwriters Hall of Fame
Piano Rolls (The Reproducing Piano Roll Foundation)
 Villaverde, Christina,  Cinco Canciones con Versos de Juana de Ibarbourou: The Art Song Style Of Ernesto Lecuona (2011).  Electronic Theses, Treatises and Dissertations. Paper 5249.
 Ernesto Lecuona recordings at the Discography of American Historical Recordings

1896 births
1963 deaths
20th-century classical composers
20th-century classical pianists
20th-century male musicians
Composers for piano
Cuban classical composers
Cuban classical pianists
Latin music composers
Male classical composers
Male classical pianists
People from Havana
Cuban people of Canarian descent
Cuban expatriates in the United States
Deaths from asthma
Burials at Gate of Heaven Cemetery (Hawthorne, New York)